Sensitivity may refer to:

Science and technology

Natural sciences
 Sensitivity (physiology), the ability of an organism or organ to respond to external stimuli
 Sensory processing sensitivity in humans
 Sensitivity and specificity, statistical measures of the performance of binary classification tests
 Allergic sensitivity, the strength of a reaction to an allergen
 The inverse of resistance (ecology), the ability of populations to remain stable when subject to disturbance

Electronics
 Sensitivity (electronics), the minimum magnitude of input signal required to produce a specified output signal
 Sensitivity of a transducer, the relationship between input and output power
 Sensitivity (electroacoustics)

Mathematics
 Sensitivity (control systems), variations in process dynamics and control systems
 Sensitivity analysis, apportionment of the uncertainty in the output of a mathematical model among its inputs
 Sensitivity and specificity, statistical measures of the performance of binary classification tests

Other uses in science and technology
 Sensitivity (explosives), the degree to which an explosive can be initiated by impact, heat or friction
 Film speed, photographic film's sensitivity to light

Music
 "Sensitivity" (Shapeshifters song), the fourth single from music group Shapeshifters
 "Sensitivity" (song), a song by rhythm and blues singer Ralph Tresvant

Other uses
 Information sensitivity, a property of information that may result in damage if disclosed
 Price sensitivity, in economics

See also
 
 Sensitization (disambiguation)
 Sensitizer (disambiguation)